The Swedish Environmental Protection Agency is a government agency in Sweden responsible for proposing and implementing environmental policies. It was founded in 1967 and reports to the Swedish Ministry of the Environment.

The following is a summary of Sweden's Sixteen Environmental Quality Objectives (verbatim from the Agency's own website, July, 2008.):

 Reduced Climate Impact
 Clean Air
 Natural Acidification Only
 A Non-Toxic Environment
 A Protective Ozone Layer
 A Safe Radiation Environment
 Zero Eutrophication
 Flourishing Lakes and Streams
 Good-Quality Groundwater
 A Balanced Marine Environment
 Thriving Wetlands
 Sustainable Forests
 A Varied Agricultural Landscape
 A Magnificent Mountain Landscape
 A Good Built Environment
 A Rich Diversity of Plant and Animal Life

Nature photographer of the year
Each year, the Swedish Environmental Protection Agency names a Swedish photographer "Nature Photographer of the Year".

References

External links
 The Swedish Environmental Protection Agency

Government agencies of Sweden
Environment of Sweden
Environmental protection agencies